Isetnofret (or Isis-nofret or Isitnofret) (Ancient Egyptian: "the beautiful Isis") was a royal woman of Ancient Egypt and, as the Great Royal Wife of Pharaoh Merenptah, she became Isetnofret II.

Family

Isetnofret II may have been the daughter of Prince Khaemwaset. If so, she married her uncle Merneptah.

Another possibility is that Isetnofret II is a daughter of King Ramesses II and possibly, a daughter of his great royal wife, Queen Isetnofret I.

Her children include:
 Prince Sety-Merenptah, who later would assume the throne as Seti II
 Prince Merenptah, King's Son, Executive at the Head of the Two Lands, and Generalissimo 
 Prince Khaemwaset, King's Son, Depicted in Karnak Temple 
 possibly, Princess Isetnofret (?), King's daughter mentioned in the Leiden ship log

Titles
The titles of Isetnofret II include: Lady of The Two Lands (nbt-t3wy), Great King’s Wife (hmt-niswt-wrt), Mistress of Upper and Lower Egypt (hnwt-Shm’w -mhw), King’s Wife (hmt-nisw).

Life
Isetnofret II grew up during the reign of Ramesses II, her possible grandfather. If she was the daughter of Khaemwaset, she may have grown up in Memphis, otherwise, she grew up in Piramesse.

Isetnofret II is attested several times during the reign of her husband:
 She is depicted on a statue usurped from Amenhotep III by Merenptah.
 A stela of the Vizier Panehesy at Gebel el Silsila also depicts her. This stela is situated across the Chapel of Panehesy and depicts Merneptah, Queen Isetnofret, Sety-Merneptah, and the vizier, before Amun-Re and Ptah.
 Another stela situated in the Gallery of the Speos of Horemheb at Gebel el Silsila depicts Merenptah followed by Queen Isetnofret and the vizier Panehesy as they offer an image of the goddess Ma'at to Amen-Re and Mut.
 A statuette dedicated by the Vizier Panehesy at Gebel el Silsila also depicts her.

It is not known when or where Isetnofret II died or where she was buried. If Isetnofret was the daughter of Khaemwaset, she may have been buried at Saqqara. The tomb of a royal lady named Isetnofret was discovered in Saqqara during 2009 excavations by Waseda University.

See also
 List of children of Ramesses II

Notes

13th-century BC Egyptian women
Queens consort of the Nineteenth Dynasty of Egypt
Children of Ramesses II